Vellicode is a village located in Kanyakumari District of Tamil Nadu, India  on National Highway 47 approximately 47 km south of Trivandrum [Nearest AirPort].

Vellicode is a scenic village which lies on the Trivandrum Kanyakumari Highway. It is one of the oldest inhibited places in the else while United States of Travancore which was annexed to India during Independence. Prior to formation of United Travancore during the 17 Century, the region was called "EDAI NADU" and were ruled by local chieftain. Today the inhabitant of this scenic village is 99% Catholic Christians and at the centre of the village stands a Majestic Catholic Church raised on a single piece of rock whose origin dates back to 1946.

History
The human inhabitants of Vellicode date back to the later Stone Age period. The earliest known grouping of the area is Idai Nadu. The region was ruled by tribal Villivan chieftains before being annexed by the Chera Dynasty during the 11th century as Kalkulam. The biggest family group occupying the village is the "ARRAPORAI Family". The earliest records with the Travancore Treasury shows that the Arraporai family held 246 Acres of land in the village and held the Jemmi right to vote. The Arraporai house which was adjusent to the current church had 33 families which lived inside the massive housing unit

Name
The ancient name of Vellicode was Sarva Vali Kode which means a place were all religions are followed.
A church, said to have been built by St Thomas the Apostle is nearby. 
Also flanged to the south is the Bhagavathy Temple.

In 1738 an exponent of martial art "Adi Murai"  named Mallan Asan of Arapurai family went to the palace grounds of Udaya Marthanda Varma and won many fights. So the king gave a silver chest armour and a silversword. He renamed his native village as Vellicode (Velli means Silver and code means cutlass).

Major family group
The biggest family group that resides in Vellicode is the Araporai Family group. They belong to Nadar Catholic Family. History traces back its legacy back to 7th century. Their forefathers (brothers Rajappa Pandian and Devappa Pandian) were Military Chieftains in the court of Pandian King "Koon Pandian". They practiced Aaseevagam  an  aesthesis religion. When King Koon Pandian converted to Saivaism he forced all his followers to convert. The Military brothers never liked the Idea.  Their Sister too refused to get forced marriage and killed herself. Seeing their dead sister the brothers got ravaged and decided to leave the pandian Kingdom.
They travelled down south crossed the Pandian Administered region and reached Edai Nadu. A local Ay Kingdom in between the Chera's and Pandya's. They went to the court of the Ay Chieftan and accepted the challenge to fight their fighter goat. With just one knock killed the goat. The chieftain was impressed and gave a grand of 246 Acres near to Val vacha Kostam and gave a Silver armor. Hence the resident place got the name Vellicode (Velli - Silver in Tamil and Kedayam - armor). 
They came in contact with the people of St Thomas sect of Christians whose  and the concepts were in line with the Aaseevagam principles, The Birth of Makkhali founder of Assevagam and the birth of Jesus resembled the same, the brothers decided to attach themselves to Christian Faith. However they followed the old rituals of Aasan (Expert in Martial Arts, Expertise in Medicine and Expertise in Magic).

For the next 1000 years (till today) the family got expanded and today in the place called Vellicode there are 800 families and all are staunch Roman Catholic. The best part is that the last eight generations are very much traceable and even all the families still hold the links together.

References

Villages in Kanyakumari district